General elections were held in Republika Srpska on 12 and 13 September 1998. They were third parliamentary election and second presidential election in three years.

Incumbent president Biljana Plavšić, who served since July 1996 after Radovan Karadžić resigned, lost to Nikola Poplašen, leader of the Serbian Radical Party of Republika Srpska. Mirko Šarović was elected Vice President.

In the parliamentary election, the Serb Democratic Party again won the most seats, but failed to form a government. Although newly elected President Poplašen tried to name SDS leader Dragan Kalinić as the new Prime Minister, he faced opposition from High Representative for Bosnia and Herzegovina Carlos Westendorp and was deposed shortly after. Prime Minister Milorad Dodik was subsequently chosen for another term.

Results

President

Parliament

References

Elections in Republika Srpska
1998 elections in Europe
1998 in Bosnia and Herzegovina